Adanaclava is a genus of sea snails, marine gastropod mollusks in the family Clathurellidae.

Species
 Adanaclava adana Bartsch, 1950: synonym of Crassispira adana (Bartsch, 1950)

References

External links
  Bouchet, P.; Kantor, Y. I.; Sysoev, A.; Puillandre, N. (2011). A new operational classification of the Conoidea. Journal of Molluscan Studies. 77, 273-308

Clathurellidae